Bull Run is an unincorporated community in Clackamas County, Oregon, United States.

George H. Himes believed the name "Bull Run" may have been because of the presence of wild cattle along the river in the pioneer era of 1849–55. This story is corroborated by settler Charles B. Talbot, who said that cattle would escape from the early immigrants to the area and ran wild for several years, and so they named the area Bull Run. A 1920s story in the Gresham Outlook states that in the 1860s, a man named Frank Mognet was living in the Cedar Creek area near Sandy. He was attempting to catch a bull that had gone wild when it ran into the then-unnamed stream. Because this was just after the Battle of Bull Run, and the bull had given him a "strong run", he immediately named the stream Bull Run.

The first post office in the area, established in 1893, was named Unavilla. It is unknown why that name was chosen. The name of the post office was changed Bullrun in 1895, and to Camp Namanu in 1939. The summer-only Camp Namanu post office closed in 1953.

In 1915, Bull Run had a population of 100, a public school and a large gladiolus farm. The community was the eastern terminus of the Mt. Hood division of the Portland Railway, Light and Power Company interurban railroad. In 1940, Bull Run had a population of 35. Current USGS topographic maps have Bull Run labeled as a "site", meaning there is no community there now, although the USGS still lists it as a populated place in its GNIS.

References

External links
History of Portland interurbans from pdxhistory.com, with map of route showing Bull Run

Unincorporated communities in Clackamas County, Oregon
1893 establishments in Oregon
Populated places established in 1893
Unincorporated communities in Oregon
Railway towns in Oregon